The Sorahi (Persian صراحی) is a new Iranian musical instrument. A member of the family of bowed string instruments developed by the Iranian musician M. R. Shajarian, This string instrument can cover the sound range produced by soprano, alto, bass and contra bass instruments.

The instrument fits into Iranian traditions of bowed instruments that include the Classical kemençe or kamancheh and ghaychak fiddles. The instrument has a mechanism for changing the instrument's tone; a pad made of leather, or leather and wood sits between the bridge and the soundboard. The instrument is played in the same manner as the kamancheh, held upright on the players lap.

Shahnaz ensemble, accompanied by M. R. Shajarian, has held its concert from Oct. 9 to 13, 2008 in Tehran featuring Sorahi.

Sources

"صراحی" استاد شجریان رونمایی می شود, Mehrnews

External links 
Bass sorahi being played
Alto sorahi being played

Persian musical instruments
Experimental musical instruments
Necked bowl lutes
Bowed instruments
Iranian inventions